Silent Thunder: A-10 Tank Killer II is a flight simulation video game and the sequel to A-10 Tank Killer, which was directed by Frank Evers (CEO).  Both games were made by Dynamix and Sierra On-Line produced Silent Thunder. It was made for Amiga and DOS platforms. In the game, the player takes the role of an American A-10 Thunderbolt II aircraft pilot who fights in various campaigns across the world.

Reviews
Gamespot review, Chris Hudak, scored the game 8.5/10 and lauded the game calling it "a wicked, clean, no-B.S. combat sim with enough options and realism to hold the serious gamer's interest." 

Other reviews include:

PC Joker Mar, 1996 - 86 out of 100 
GameSpot May 01, 1996 - 85 out of 100 
Gameplay Jun, 1996 - 84 out of 100 
PC Action Mar, 1996 - 83 out of 100 
PC Player (Denmark) 1996 - 83 out of 100 
PC Games (Germany) Mar, 1996 - 82 out of 100
Power Play (Germany) Mar, 1996 - 80 out of 100 
Computer Gaming Magazine Jan 13, 1999 - 80 out of 100
PC Gamer (Windows) Jun, 1996 - 70 out of 100 
World Village Gamer Zone 1996 - 60 out of 100
PC Player (Germany) (Windows) 	May, 1996 	- 3 Stars 60% 
High Score (Windows) Aug, 1996 - 2 out of 5 
Computer Gaming World (Windows) Jun, 1996 - 2 Stars 40%

See also
A-10 Tank Killer
A-10 Attack! (1995)
A-10 Cuba! (1996)
Red Baron (1990)

References

External links

1996 video games
Flight simulation video games
North America-exclusive video games
Video games developed in the United States
Video games set in Asia
Video games set in South America
Video games set in South Korea
Dynamix games
Single-player video games